Archibald William Alexander Montgomerie, 17th Earl of Eglinton (16 October 1914 – 21 April 1966) was the son of Archibald Montgomerie, 16th Earl of Eglinton.

He was educated at Eton and New College, Oxford.

On 10 November 1938, he married Ursula Joan Watson and they had four children:

Archibald George Montgomerie, 18th Earl of Eglinton (27 August 1939 – 14 June 2018)
Susanna Montgomerie (b. 19 October 1941)
Elizabeth Beatrice Montgomerie (b. 29 August 1945)
Egida Seton Montgomerie (1945–1957)

Freemasonry
Whilst a student at New College he was Initiated into English Freemasonry in Apollo University Lodge, No.357, (Oxford), in 1936. After completing his education and returning to Scotland he joined Lodge Mother Kilwinning, No.0, in 1947. He served as Master of that Lodge 1949–1957. He also affiliated to Lodge Montgomerie Kilwinning, No.624, (Skelmorlie, North Ayrshire) in 1947 and served as Master for that year. Also in 1949 he was appointed Provincial Grand Master for Ayrshire by the Grand Lodge of Scotland and in capacity 1949–1957 – the same period he was Master of Lodge Mother Kilwinning. His first office in the Grand Lodge of Scotland was as Grand Architect in 1948–1949.

See also
 Eglinton Castle

References

External links

The Grand Lodge of Antient Free and Accepted Masons of Scotland.

1914 births
1966 deaths
People educated at Eton College
Alumni of New College, Oxford
17
Place of birth missing
Place of death missing
Scottish Freemasons
Clan Montgomery